Mary Catherine Bateson (December 8, 1939 – January 2, 2021) was an American writer and cultural anthropologist.

The daughter of Margaret Mead and Gregory Bateson, Bateson was a noted author in her field with many published monographs. Among her books was With a Daughter's Eye: A Memoir of Margaret Mead and Gregory Bateson, a recounting of her upbringing by two famous parents. She taught at Harvard, Amherst, and George Mason University, among others. Bateson was a fellow of the International Leadership Forum and was president of the Institute for Intercultural Studies in New York until 2010.

Early life and education 
Bateson was a graduate of the Brearley School and received her B.A. from Radcliffe in 1960 and her Ph.D. in linguistics and Middle Eastern Studies from Harvard in 1963. Her dissertation examined linguistic patterns in pre-Islamic Arabic poetry.

Personal life
Bateson was married to Barkev Kassarjian, a professor of management at Babson College, from 1960 to her death. They had one daughter, Sevanne Margaret (born 1969), an actress who works professionally under the name Sevanne Martin, and two grandsons. Through her mother's side of the family, Bateson was also the cousin of Jeremy Steig as well as a niece of William Steig and Leo Rosten.

Death
Bateson died on January 2, 2021, at a hospice near her home in Lebanon, New Hampshire, aged 81. She had suffered from brain damage from a fall a few months earlier.

Style 
Bateson considered herself an “activist for peace and justice” and stressed the importance in the years of “unanticipated longevity” of continuing to be willing to learn.

At the beginning of her career, she was a linguist and studied Arabic poetry. Then, she shifted her focus from a professional interest in human patterns of communication to highly-formalistic studies, which started her career as an anthropologist. Changing focus in topics, Bateson began to use her own life experience to write. Bateson used her own experience as a woman, daughter, mother, scholar, and anthropologist, who went through many different situations, as a guide for her writings. Bateson liked to keep her readers engaged by having them question her ideology and entertain the readings own provoking thoughts with questions. She wrote in a similar style to journaling and often used personal examples or quotes for ideas and observations. She also used cross-cultural experiences of other individuals incorporated into her writings.

One of Bateson's first books was her memoir With a Daughter's Eye in which she reflected on her earlier life with her parents: Margaret Mead and Gregory Bateson. The memoir created a path for self-discovery and enablement of the experiences that she incorporated into her writings, such as her next book,  Composing a Life. That book showed how deeply connected Bateson's own journey as a scholar as parallel was to a world in which she and other women faced overt sexism and female inferiority. She questioned the gender expectations and the misogynistic reality of the 1980s with her book by using her own experience as a parallel.

In all of her work, she used that method to help fuel her writings. Many of her books are still used as inspiration for feminists who question gendered expectations.

Bibliography 
Thinking Race: Social Myths and Biological Realities (2019) with Richard Goldsby
Composing a Further Life: The Age of Active Wisdom (2010)
Willing to Learn: Passages of Personal Discovery (2004)
Full Circles, Overlapping Lives: Culture and Generation in Transition (2000)
Peripheral Visions - Learning Along the Way (1994)
Composing a Life (1991)
Thinking AIDS (1988) with Richard Goldsby
Angels Fear: Towards an Epistemology of the Sacred (1987) written with Gregory Bateson
With a Daughter's Eye: A Memoir of Margaret Mead and Gregory Bateson (1984)
At Home in Iran (1974)
Our Own Metaphor: A Personal Account of a Conference on the Effects of Conscious Purpose on Human Adaptation (1972)
Arabic Language Handbook (1967)

References

External links

 Papers of Mary Catherine Bateson, 1954–2004 (inclusive), 1975–2001 (bulk): A Finding Aid. Schlesinger Library, Radcliffe Institute, Harvard University.

1939 births
2021 deaths
American women anthropologists
Radcliffe College alumni
Writers from New York City
Cyberneticists
Women cyberneticists
Brearley School alumni
20th-century American anthropologists
21st-century American anthropologists
Bateson family
21st-century American women